Jawaharlal Institute of Technology (JIT) is an educational institute located in Borawan, Khargone district, Madhya Pradesh, India. The college have been approved by the All India Council for Technical Education, and is affiliated to Rajiv Gandhi Proudyogiki Vishwavidyalaya.

History
Jawaharlal Institute of Technology was established by Subhash ji Yadav in the year of 1997. Under Jawaharlal Nehru Education and Charitable Trust in Borawan. The colleges offers 6 undergraduate and five postgraduate courses.

Courses offered
Under Graduate Courses
 B.E. - Civil Engineering
 B.E. - Computer Science and Engineering
 B.E. - Electrical and Electronics Engineering
 B.E. - Electronics and Communication Engineering
 B.E. - Mechanical Engineering
 B.E. - Information Technology

Post Graduate Courses
M.E. - Computer Science
MCA - Master of Computer Applications
M.E. - Transportation Engineering
M.E. - Power Electronics
M.E. - Industrial Engineering

References

External links
 Official website

Engineering colleges in Madhya Pradesh
Khargone district
Educational institutions established in 1997
1997 establishments in Madhya Pradesh